Route 666 may refer to:

Highways

Canada 
 Alberta Highway 666
 Ontario Highway 666, renumbered to 658 in 1985

Ireland 
 R666 road (Ireland)

United Kingdom 
 A666 road

United States 
 U.S. Route 666, renumbered in 2003 to U.S. Route 491 
 Florida State Road 666
 County Route 666 (Atlantic County, New Jersey)
 Ohio State Route 666
 Pennsylvania Route 666

Media

Comics
 Route 666 (comics), a 2002 comic book published by CrossGen Comics

Music
 Route 666 (Helltrain album), 2006
 Route 666 (The Iron Maidens album), 2007
 Route 666 (The Hamsters album), 1995
 "Route 666", a song by God Is an Astronaut from The End of the Beginning
 "Route 666", a song by The Comsat Angels from My Mind's Eye
 "Route 666", a song by BB Tone from Natural Born Killers

Film and television 
 Route 666 (film), a 2001 American horror film
 Route 666: America's Scariest Home Haunts, an Internet TV series
 "Route 666" (Married... with Children), an episode of Married... with Children
 "Route 666" (Supernatural), an episode of Supernatural
 "Route 666", a fictional funhouse ride in the 2004 film The Machinist

Video games 
 Ride to Hell: Route 666, a cancelled digitally distributed spinoff of Ride to Hell: Retribution